Angermüller is a German surname. Notable people with the name include:

Johannes Angermuller (born 1973), professor and researcher
Josef Angermüller (1949–1977), speedway rider
Monique Angermüller (born 1984), former speed skater
Rudolph Angermüller (born 1940), musicologist

German-language surnames